Linda Kavanagh (died 17 March 2003) was a leading member of the Workers' Party and a member of Dublin City Council.

Linda Kavanagh died at the age of 46 on 17 March 2003 after a brief illness. A native of Inchicore she joined the Workers' Party in the mid 1980s and represented the party in a number of elections.  She worked with former Workers' Party President and Dublin West TD Tomás Mac Giolla and when he retired from public life in 1998 she was co-opted in his place onto Dublin City Council.

She was involved in a number of community organisations in the Ballyfermot area and in Inchicore where she lived. She worked at St. James' Hospital and later became a full-time project worker with the Markiewicz Centre in Ballyfermot. She was the first chairperson of Ballyfermot Partnership and a founding member of the Lower Ballyfermot Tenants and Residents Association.

In the mid 1990s Kavanagh won a landmark Supreme Court ruling regarding the adoption rights of non-married couples and she had also won compensation for householders for conversion of their homes to smokeless fuels.

She pushed for the provision of a new club house for St. Matthew's Boxing Club in Ballyfermot and for the provision of a centre in Inchicore for drug misusers.  The new centre was opened in 2006 and was named the Kavanagh Centre in her honour.  It was officially opened on 4 May by the then Minister of State at the Department of Community, Rural and Gaeltacht Affairs, Noel Ahern TD who said, “”As a resident of Inchicore, as the first chairperson of the Inchicore Community Drug Team and as a city councillor, Linda worked tirelessly on behalf of the disadvantaged and particularly drug misusers.  I understand that one of her last tasks was to sign the legal papers to secure this building.  I know that the management committee of the Inchicore Drug Team are very thankful to the Kavanagh family for allowing the use of her name for the premises.  It will be a permanent reminder to all, of her work and dedication to the people of this community”

References

Year of birth missing
2003 deaths
Workers' Party (Ireland) politicians
Local councillors in Dublin (city)